This is a list detailing the electoral history of the Conservative Party in New York, sorted by year.  The list currently consists of candidates who ran for partisan office, either those who ran on the Conservative Party label or were endorsed by the party. In the case of endorsements, the vote tallied is that which the candidate received under that label.

Federal Elections

President of the United States

U.S. Senate Class I Seat

U.S. Senate Class III Seat
The Conservative's candidate win in the United States Senate election in New York, 1970 was the breakthrough race for the party.

U.S. House of Representatives

State Elections

Governor

Attorney General

Comptroller

State Assembly

Local Elections

Mayor of Buffalo

Mayor of New York City

References

Election results by party in the United States